Anatrachyntis hieroglypta is a moth in the family Cosmopterigidae. It was described by Edward Meyrick in 1911, and is known from Seychelles.

References

Moths described in 1911
Anatrachyntis
Moths of Africa